The Chicago and Aurora Railroad was an early predecessor of the Chicago, Burlington and Quincy Railroad that built a line from West Chicago to Mendota via Aurora, Illinois.

History
The Illinois General Assembly chartered the Aurora Branch Railroad on February 12, 1849, to build a branch of the Galena and Chicago Union Railroad to Aurora, which it opened on September 2, 1850. The company was renamed Chicago and Aurora Railroad on June 22, 1852, and given expanded powers to extend from Aurora to a point north of LaSalle; this extension, to Mendota, was completed on October 20, 1853. Another amendment, passed February 28, 1854, authorized the company to build east from Aurora to Chicago via Naperville, and changed its name to Chicago and Southwestern Railroad. The latter provision was never acted upon, and was repealed by an act of February 14, 1855, which instead changed the name to Chicago, Burlington and Quincy Railroad (CB&Q). The Aurora-Chicago line was opened on May 20, 1864, by which time the CB&Q had, through acquisitions, acquired a main line from Chicago to Galesburg, where it split into branches for Burlington and Quincy.

The portion of the Chicago and Aurora between Aurora and Mendota remains a main line of CB&Q successor Burlington Northern Santa Fe Railway. This section of track makes up part of the Mendota Subdivision, which continues south-southwest to Galesburg. The original West Chicago-Aurora branch line is now an industrial track of the Chicago Subdivision.
It hosts about _ freight trains a day, and Amtrak Southwest Chief #3 and 4, California Zephyr #5 and 6, Illinois Zephyr #383 and 380, and Carl Sandburg #381 and 382.
It currently runs through Aurora, Montgomery, Bristol, Plano, Sandwich, Somonauk, Leland, Earlville, Meriden, Mendota, Clarion, Arlington, Zearing, Malden, Princeton, Wyanet, Buda, Neponset, Kewanee, Galva, Altona, Oneida, Wataga, and Galesburg.
It interchanges with the Illinois Railway La Salle Line in Zearing, the Union Pacific Troy Grove Sub in Earlville, and the Illinois Railway Ottawa Line in Montgomery, all in Illinois.

The original Chicago-Aurora line, the oldest commuter rail line in the Chicago area, still exists today as Metra's BNSF Railway Line, operated by the BNSF Railway, which is the successor of the CB&Q through numerous mergers.

See also
List of defunct Illinois railroads

References

Defunct Illinois railroads
Predecessors of the Chicago, Burlington and Quincy Railroad
Railway companies established in 1852
Railway companies disestablished in 1855
1852 establishments in Illinois